The following lists events that happened during 1997 in the Grand Duchy of Luxembourg.

Incumbents

Events

January – March

April – June
 17 April – The weekly newspaper Le Jeudi is launched by Editpress.
 17 May – The Compagnie Grand-Ducale d'Électricité du Luxembourg is renamed 'Cegedel'.
 31 May – Jeunesse Esch win the Luxembourg Cup, beating Union Luxembourg 2–0 in the final.
 15 June – Belgium's Frank Vandenbroucke wins the 1997 Tour de Luxembourg.

July – September
 1 July – Luxembourg assumes the rotating Presidency of the Council of the European Union for the following six months.
 28 September – The first Luxembourg Grand Prix is held: not in Luxembourg, but at the Nürburgring, in the nearby German town of Nürburg.  Jacques Villeneuve wins the race.

October – December
 9 October – Luxair places an order for two Embraer ERJ 145 regional jets following the airline's decision to create an all-jet fleet.
 2 December – SES launches its seventh satellite, Astra 1G.

Births

 30 July – Jessica Berscheid, footballer

Deaths
 14 March – Nicolas Morn, cyclist
 8 July – Joseph Probst, artist
 5 December – Jim Kirchen, cyclist

References

 
Years of the 20th century in Luxembourg
Luxembourg